Repertor is one of seven Thames barges built between 1925 and 1930 for F W Horlock, Mistley.

History
In 1924 the Horlocks commissioned seven new steel Thames barges, of which Repertor was the first. Six of these ‘seven sisters’ are still afloat: Blue Mermaid was lost to a mine in World War 2.  They were built at Mistley.

References

Bibliography

External links

Repertor
1924 ships
Individual sailing vessels
Ships built in Mistley
Transport on the River Thames
Sailing ships of the United Kingdom